Simon Niepmann (born 2 August 1985) is a Swiss rower. He is a gold medal winner at the 2016 Rio Olympics in the men's lightweight four, with the team being coached by New Zealander Ian Wright. He also competed in the Men's lightweight coxless four event at the 2012 Summer Olympics.

References

1985 births
Living people
Swiss male rowers
Olympic rowers of Switzerland
Rowers at the 2012 Summer Olympics
Rowers at the 2016 Summer Olympics
People from Lörrach
Sportspeople from Freiburg (region)
World Rowing Championships medalists for Switzerland
Olympic gold medalists for Switzerland
Olympic medalists in rowing
Medalists at the 2016 Summer Olympics
European Rowing Championships medalists